Provanna ios is a species of deep-sea sea snail, a marine gastropod mollusk in the family Provannidae.

Description

Distribution
This species occurs in East Pacific hydrothermal vents at the Galapagos Rift.

References

 Warén A. & Bouchet P. (2001). Gastropoda and Monoplacophora from hydrothermal vents and seeps new taxa and records. The Veliger 44(2): 116–231

ios
Gastropods described in 1986